Srednji Potok is a small settlement in the valley of Potok Creek, a minor tributary of the Kolpa River, in the Municipality of Kostel in southern Slovenia. The area is part of the traditional region of Lower Carniola and is now included in the Southeast Slovenia Statistical Region.

References

External links
Srednji Potok on Geopedia

Populated places in the Municipality of Kostel